Frank Richard Kotowski (born September 30, 1935) is an American politician in the state of New Hampshire. He is a member of the New Hampshire House of Representatives, sitting as a Republican from the Merrimack 24 district, having been first elected in 2008.

References

Living people
1935 births
Republican Party members of the New Hampshire House of Representatives
Politicians from Boulder, Colorado
People from Hooksett, New Hampshire
21st-century American politicians